Senator Miller may refer to:

Members of the United States Senate
Homer V. M. Miller (1814–1896), U.S. Senator from Georgia in 1871
Jack Miller (politician) (1916–1994), U.S. Senator from Iowa from 1961 to 1973
Jacob W. Miller (1800–1862), U.S. Senator from New Jersey from 1841 to 1853
John E. Miller (1888–1981), U.S. Senator from Arkansas from 1937 to 1941
John Franklin Miller (senator) (1831–1886), U.S. Senator from California from 1881
Stephen Decatur Miller (1787–1838), U.S. Senator from South Carolina from 1831 to 1833
Warner Miller (1838–1918), U.S. Senator from New York from 1881 to 1887
Zell Miller (1932–2018), U.S. Senator from Georgia from 2000 to 2005

United States state senate members
Anton M. Miller (1876–1954), Wisconsin State Senate
Archie H. Miller (1886–1958), Minnesota State Senate
Art Miller Jr. (born 1946), Michigan State Senate
Arthur L. Miller (1892–1967), Nebraska State Senate
Barry Miller (politician) (1864–1933), Texas State Senate
Bert H. Miller (1879–1949), Idaho State Senate
Brad Miller (politician) (born 1953), North Carolina State Senate
Butch Miller (politician) (born 1956), Georgia State Senate
Charles R. Miller (politician) (1857–1927), Delaware State Senate
Clyde L. Miller (1910–1988), Utah State Senate
Dale Miller (born 1949), Ohio State Senate
David Miller (Iowa politician) (born 1946), Iowa State Senate
Edwin E. Miller (died 1950), Pennsylvania State Senate
Elizabeth Ruby Miller (1905–1988), Iowa State Senate
Eugene Miller (Texas politician) (1899–1948), Texas Senate State Senate
Ezra Miller (politician) (1812–1885), Wisconsin State Senate and New Jersey State Senate
Fleming Bowyer Miller (1792–1874), Virginia State Senate
George Miller Jr. (1914–1969), California State Senate
Henry D. Miller (1867–1945), Iowa State Senate
Hinda Miller (born 1950), Vermont State Senate
Jacob Henry Miller (1865–1920), Ohio State Senate
Jeff Miller (Tennessee politician) (born 1962), Tennessee State Senate
Jeremy Miller (politician) (born 1983), Minnesota State Senate
Jess Miller (1884–1965), Wisconsin State Senate
Jesse Miller (politician) (1800–1850), Pennsylvania State Senate
Joe Miller (North Dakota politician), North Dakota State Senate
John Miller (Virginia politician) (1947–2016), Virginia State Senate
Joshua Miller (politician) (born 1954), Rhode Island State Senate
Julius Miller (1880–1955), New York State Senate
Keith Harvey Miller (1925–2019), Alaska State Senate
Ken Miller (Montana politician), Montana State Senate
Les Miller (Florida politician) (born 1951), Florida State Senate
Leslie A. Miller (1886–1970), Wyoming State Senate
Mark F. Miller (born 1943), Wisconsin State Senate
Mike W. Miller (born 1951), Alaska State Senate
Nathan H. Miller (born 1943), Virginia State Senate
Patricia Miller (Indiana politician) (born 1936), Indiana State Senate
Ray Miller (Ohio legislator) (born 1949), Ohio State Senate
Ronald F. Miller (born 1954), West Virginia State Senate
Smith Miller (1804–1872), Indiana State Senate
Terry Miller (politician) (1942–1989), Alaska State Senate
Thomas E. Miller (1849–1938), South Carolina State Senate
Thomas V. Miller Jr. (1942–2021), Maryland State Senate
V. Richard Miller (1939–2016), Indiana State Senate
Vic Miller (born 1951), Kansas State Senate
Warren Miller (West Virginia Congressman) (1847–1920), West Virginia State Senate
William Miller (Confederate Army officer) (1820–1909), Florida State Senate
William Miller (North Carolina politician) (1783–1825), North Carolina State Senate
Yvonne B. Miller (1934–2012), Virginia State Senate

See also
Senator Millar (disambiguation)
Senator Millner (disambiguation)